Cymothoa elegans is a species of parasitic isopod in the genus Cymothoa. It has rarely been recorded, with all records coming from the north coast of Java. They are in the arthropod phylum and can more closely be classified as crustaceans.

Description 
Cymothoa Elegans has a solid structure exoskeleton which is calcareous and chitinous. This means that it has a sort of horny structure that is part of its exoskeleton and is made up of calcium carbonate. The body is dorso-ventrally flattened, which means it is flattened on both the top and bottom side of the species, which is common for  marine isopods. In addition to this exoskeleton in isopods, cymothoa elegans have their upper-surface of their body made up of overlapping plates that provide both protection and flexibility for the specimen to move. They have jointed limbs with non-specialized legs and these parasitic isopods are similar in size and environment to amphipods. The body plan is made up of a head, a thorax, and an abdomen.

Distribution 
This species has been recorded to be found off of the north coast of Java, Indonesia. More broadly, parasitic isopods are more commonly found in tropical and subtropical locations.

Behavior 
This type of parasite attacks the mouth cavity of fish and eats it. It can be found on the lip or inside the actual mouth and has even been located in the gills. The isopod can also be found on the outside of the fish, possibly before entering the mouth. This can hurt or kill the host, which causes problems for fishermen trying to catch the fish. In addition, these wounds that the fish create can cause entry points for microbes and further disease. A single organism will spend its life cycle on one host, thus using the host to survive during its entire life.

Digestion 
Because these parasites are blood-sucking, they suck all of their food into their esophagus, which is then passed to the stomach (Ruppert). They have adapted mouthparts ideal for clinging and sucking for holding on to their hosts.

Reproduction 
Eggs are held with the female in their brood pouch either inside or outside the body. It is unclear whether or not Cymothoa elegans are hermaphrodites, meaning they are born a male and develop into females later in life. This is because overall, this is a very undiscovered species, yet it is common for other parasitic isopods.

References 

Cymothoida
Crustaceans described in 1885